After the Ball is an album by the American folk musician John Fahey, 
released in 1973. It was his second and last recording on the Reprise label and like its predecessor, Of Rivers and Religion, it sold poorly.

History 
Following in the same mold as Fahey's first album with Reprise, Of Rivers and Religion, accompanists were used on most of the material. Denny Bruce was once again co-producer and many of the musicians were the same. Jack Feierman again wrote the ensemble arrangements. Like Of Rivers and Religion, the Dixieland-style jazz danceband numbers were unlike anything else Fahey had done before. Following the fulfillment of the two-album contract and lackluster sales, Fahey was released from Reprise and went back to recording for his own Takoma label.

Speaking of both Of Rivers and Religion and After the Ball in a 1998 interview for The Wire, Fahey recalled, "I don't understand why they got bad reviews. It's like every time I wanted to do something other than play guitar I got castigated."

"Bucktown Stomp" is an adaptation of "Smoketown Strut" by the blues guitar player Sylvester Weaver. The version of "Candy Man" here is based on Reverend Gary Davis' version. Fahey later re-recorded "Hawaiian Two-Step" as "Spanish Two-Step".

The title song, "After the Ball" by Charles K. Harris, was popularized in Oscar Hammerstein II and Jerome Kern's 1927 musical Show Boat.

Reception 

In his Allmusic review, critic Jeff Schwachter wrote, "...the album suffers from too many mood swings. Individually, however, the tunes are strong and the arrangements very accessible and light." and "The album cover and even the selected tunes and titles are cuttingly funny, but the songs themselves are played warmly and delivered with care, heartfelt arrangements, and a slightly satirical sentimentality."

The music critic Robert Christgau wrote, "I'd rather listen to this collection of standards and acoustic blues and rag inventions than any rock record this side of the Allmans and the New York Dolls. Conditionally guaranteed."

In a review of the reissue, the music critic Thom Jurek called it "...a more up-tempo affair steeped in the Delta blues and in wildly varying New Orleans and bluegrass music."

Reissues 
After the Ball was reissued along with Of Rivers and Religion on CD in 2003 by Warner Bros. Records.

Track listing

Side one
 "Horses" (Fahey) – 2:07
 "New Orleans Shuffle" (Bill Whitmore) – 3:17
 "Beverly" (Fahey) – 4:48
 "Om Shanthi Norris" (Fahey) – 5:49

Side two
 "I Wish I Knew How It Would Feel to Be Free" (Billy Taylor, Dick Dallas, Fahey) – 2:35
 "When You Wore a Tulip (And I Wore a Big Red Rose)" (Percy Wenrich, Jack Mahoney) – 2:33
 "Hawaiian Two-Step" (Fahey) – 2:39
 "Bucktown Stomp" (Fahey) – 2:14
 "Candy Man" (Reverend Gary Davis) – 1:26
 "After the Ball" (Charles K. Harris, Oscar Hammerstein II, Jerome Kern) – 3:39

Personnel
John Fahey – guitar
Chris Darrow – guitar, fiddle
Joel Druckman – double bass
Dick Cary – piano, horn
Joe Darensbourg – clarinet
Jack Feierman – trumpet
Peter Jameson – guitar
John Rotella – saxophone
Allen Reuse – banjo, mandolin, ukulele
Britt Woodman – trombone
Production notes
John Fahey – producer
Denny Bruce – producer
Jack Feierman – arranger
Doug Decker – engineer
Richie Unterberger – reissue liner notes
Sherman Weisburg – photography

References

1973 albums
John Fahey (musician) albums
Albums produced by Denny Bruce
Albums produced by John Fahey (musician)